Mastacembelus flavidus is a species of fish in the family Mastacembelidae. It is endemic to Lake Tanganyika in Burundi, the Democratic Republic of the Congo, Tanzania, and Zambia.

References

flavidus
Fish of Lake Tanganyika
Taxonomy articles created by Polbot
Fish described in 1962
Taxa named by Hubert Matthes